Robert L. Parker is an American geophysicist and mathematician, currently holding a Professor Emeritus of Geophysics position at the Scripps Institution of Oceanography at the University of California, San Diego in La Jolla, California.

The Institute of Geophysics and Planetary Physics in La Jolla 
After completing a  B.A. in Natural Sciences in 1963, M.A. in 1964, and Ph.D. in 1966 in Geophysics at Downing College, Cambridge in England, Parker moved to the U.S. to work at the Institute of Geophysics and Planetary Physics (IGPP).  He has subsequently built on work by Freeman Gilbert and George Backus regarding inverse theory.  He is a former director of IGPP.

Personal life
Parker is an avid bicyclist and keeps track of all of his miles. He has also written about the energy behind bicycle physics.

Awards 
John Adam Fleming Medal, American Geophysical Union (2008)
Gold Medal of the Royal Astronomical Society (1998)
Fellow, Royal Society of London (1989)
Fellow, American Geophysical Union (1976)
James B. Macelwane Medal of the American Geophysical Union (1976)
Guggenheim Fellowship (1975)
Sloan Fellowship (1969–1971)
Downing College Bye Fellowship (1965–1966)
Downing College, Major Open Scholarship (1960–1963)
State Scholarship Grant (1960–1963

References

Living people
Year of birth missing (living people)
Alumni of Downing College, Cambridge
American geophysicists
University of California, San Diego faculty
Recipients of the Gold Medal of the Royal Astronomical Society
Fellows of the American Geophysical Union
Fellows of the Royal Society